The year 2007 is the sixth year in the history of Cage Warriors, a mixed martial arts promotion based in the United Kingdom. In 2007 Cage Rage Championships held 4 events beginning with, CWFC: Enter The Rough House 2.

Events list

CWFC: Enter The Rough House 2

CWFC: Enter The Rough House 2 was an event held on April 28, 2007 in Nottingham, England.

Results

CWFC: Enter The Rough House 3

CWFC: Enter The Rough House 3 was an event held on July 21, 2007 in Nottingham, England.

Results

CWFC: Enter The Rough House 4

CWFC: Enter The Rough House 4 was an event held on October 14, 2007 in Nottingham, England.

Results

CWFC: Enter The Rough House 5

CWFC: Enter The Rough House 5 was an event held on December 8, 2007 in Nottingham, England.

Results

See also 
 Cage Warriors

References

Cage Warriors events
2007 in mixed martial arts